Rajibul Islam (born 30 December 1994) is a Bangladeshi cricketer. He made his first-class debut for Khulna Division in the 2013–14 National Cricket League on 30 January 2014. He made his Twenty20 debut on 7 June 2021, for Partex Sporting Club in the 2021 Dhaka Premier Division Twenty20 Cricket League.

References

External links
 

1994 births
Living people
Bangladeshi cricketers
City Club cricketers
Khelaghar Samaj Kallyan Samity cricketers
Khulna Division cricketers
Partex Sporting Club cricketers
Place of birth missing (living people)